El noticiero (The News) is a Venezuelan news program, it broadcasts daily on Televen.

News editions 
1988-1991
Morning: 6:00 a.m.
Evening: 7:00 p.m.

1992-1996
Noon: 12:00 p.m. (half-hour)
Evening: 7:00 p.m.

1997-2000
Morning: 6:00 a.m.
Noon: 12:00 p.m.
30 minutos de El Noticiero: 7:30 p.m.
Evening: 10:00 p.m.

Since 2000
Morning: 8:00 a.m.
Noon 12:00 p.m.
Evenin: 11:00 p.m. (changed at 11:30 pm by order of the Law of Social Responsibility in Radio and Television)

2014–present
Morning: 6:00 a.m.
Noon 12:00 p.m.
Evening: 10:00 p.m.

See also 
 List of programs broadcast by Televen

References

External links 
  

1988 Venezuelan television series debuts
Venezuelan television news shows
Televen original programming